Peppermint Hotels is an Indian budget boutique hotel chain. The flagship hotel is located in Gurgaon.

In 2011, Peppermint received an award for the "Best Budget & Economy Hotel" at the Hotel Investment Conference South Asia.

References

See also

Hotel chains in India
Economy of Gurgaon
Companies with year of establishment missing